The 1970 Cornell Big Red football team was an American football team that represented Cornell University during the 1970 NCAA University Division football season. Cornell finished fourth in the Ivy League. 

In its fifth season under head coach Jack Musick, the team compiled a 6–3 record and outscored opponents 193 to 185. Dennis Lubozynski was the team captain. 

Cornell's 4–3 conference record placed fourth in the Ivy League standings. The Big Red was outscored 164 to 135 by Ivy opponents. 

Cornell played its home games at Schoellkopf Field in Ithaca, New York.

Schedule

Roster

References

Cornell
Cornell Big Red football seasons
Cornell Big Red football